Christopher Galvin (born 24 November 1951) is an English former professional footballer who played as a midfielder in the Football League for Leeds United, Hull City, York City and Stockport County. He was capped by the England national youth team in 1970. And then, he transferred to Hong Kong club Tsuen Wan. before retired.

References

1951 births
Living people
Footballers from Huddersfield
English footballers
England youth international footballers
Association football midfielders
Leeds United F.C. players
Hull City A.F.C. players
York City F.C. players
Stockport County F.C. players
English Football League players
English football managers
English expatriate football managers